The soap opera Caminhos do Coração and its second season, Os Mutantes - Caminhos do Coração, have various fictional character genetic mutations. Below is a list of all mutants characters who have already passed since the first season and still other only from the second season.

Powers absorbed by Samira
Samira has the power to absorb the powers of other mutants (powers of mimicry). To do this you only need to pass that a mutant next to her, it is not necessary for it to ring. Below the powers already acquired:

Fictional mutants